This is a timeline of philosophy in the 17th century (17th-century philosophy).

Events 

 1649 – Christina, Queen of Sweden (reigned 1632–1654) invited René Descartes to educate her in his philosophical views, particularly his insight into Catholicism. Descartes arrived on 4 October 1649, and tutored her for the next 4 months until he caught pneumonia and died ten days later on 11 February 1650. Speculations have been made as to the causes of his illness. Some cite the icy weather, others argue it may have been elicited by the rigorous schedule asked of Descartes by the queen. In 1991 a German scholar published a book questioning this account and more arguments against its veracity have been raised.

Publications 
 1644 – Andrzej Maksymilian Fredro - Monita Politico-Moralia et Icon Ingeniorum
 1649 – René Descartes - Passions of the Soul
   1649   – Pierre Gassendi - Animadversiones
   1649 – John Milton - Tenure of Kings and Magistrates
 1688 – Gottfried Leibniz 
Brevis Demonstratio Erroris Memorabilis Cartesii et Aliorum Circa Legem Naturae (A Brief Demonstration of the Memorable Error of Descartes and Others About the Law of Nature)
Discours de Métaphysique
1670 - Blaise Pascal - Pensées [Thoughts] (incomplete at his death in 1662)
 1700 – Mary Astell, Some Reflections Upon Marriage

Births 
 1632 – John Locke
 1649 – Samuel Bold - English advocate of John Locke's argument for religious toleration (d. 1737)
   1649   – Samuel Johnson (pamphleteer) - One of the major developers of the Whig resistance theory (d. 1703)
 October 11 1675 – Samuel Clarke, English philosopher (d. 1729)

Deaths 
 November 19 1649 – Caspar Schoppe (born 1576) - Best known for his book Grammatica philosophica (Milan, 1628)
 February 21 1677 – Baruch Spinoza, Dutch philosopher (born 1632)
 1662 – Blaise Pascal, French mathematician and philosopher (born 1623).
1699 – Edward Stillingfleet, a critic of Locke.

See also
List of centuries in philosophy

References

Further reading
Daniel Garber and Michael Ayers (eds). The Cambridge History of Seventeenth-century Philosophy. Cambridge University Press. 1998. First paperback edition. 2003. Volume 2. 
Dan Kaufman (ed). The Routledge Companion to Seventeenth Century Philosophy. 2017. Google Books.
Stuart Hampshire. The Master Philosophers: The Age of Reason: The 17th Century Philosophers. A Meridian Classic. New American Library. Meridian Books. Reprint. 1993. Google Books.
Peter R Anstey (ed). The Oxford Handbook of British Philosophy in the Seventeenth Century. 2013. Google Books.
Wiep Van Bunge. From Stevin to Spinoza: An Essay on Philosophy in the Seventeenth-Century Dutch Republic. Brill. Leiden, Boston, Koln. 2001. Google Books
José R Maia Neto. Academic Skepticism in Seventeenth-Century French Philosophy: The Charronian Legacy 1601–1662. (International Archives of the History of Ideas 215). Springer. 2014. Google Books.
G A J Rogers, Tom Sorell and Jill Kraye (eds). Insiders and Outsiders in Seventeenth-Century Philosophy. Taylor and Francis e-Library. 2009. Routledge. 2010. Google Books.
Ross Harrison. Hobbes, Locke, and Confusion's Masterpiece: An Examination of Seventeenth Political Philosophy. Cambridge University Press. 2003. Google Books
Tom Sorell, G A J Rogers, Jill Kraye (eds) Scientia in Early Modern Philosophy: Seventeenth-Century Thinkers on Demonstrative Knowledge from First Principles. (Studies in History and Philosophy of Science 24). Springer. 2010. Google Books.
Susan James. Passion and Action: The Emotions in Seventeenth-century Philosophy. Clarendon Press. Reprinted 1999. Google Books.
Jacqueline Broad. Women Philosophers of the Seventeenth Century. Cambridge University Press. 2003. Google Books.
Henry Hallam. Introduction to the Literature of Europe, in the Fifteenth, Sixteenth, and Seventeenth Centuries. John Murray. Ablemarle Street, London. 1839. Volume 4. Chapter 3 ("History of Speculative Philosophy from 1650 to 1700"). Page 182 et seq.

Early Modern philosophy
Philosophy by century